Things Have Changed is a studio album by Bettye LaVette. It was released in March 2018 through Verve Records. The album features songs originally written and sung by Bob Dylan.

The album received a nomination for Best Americana Album and "Don't Fall Apart on Me Tonight" received a nomination for Best Traditional R&B Performance at the 61st Annual Grammy Awards.

Greil Marcus, writing in the Village Voice, named it the best album of 2018.

Lavette's arrangement of the title track has proven influential. Both Margo Price and Adia Victoria have performed the song live in arrangements directly inspired by LaVette's.

Track listing
All tracks composed by Bob Dylan

See also
List of songs written by Bob Dylan
List of artists who have covered Bob Dylan songs

References

2018 albums
Bettye LaVette albums
Bob Dylan tribute albums
Verve Records albums